Actiomera is a genus of crabs in the family Xanthidae, containing the following species:

 Actiomera boninensis (Odhner, 1925)
 Actiomera erythra (Lanchester, 1902)
 Actiomera lophopa (Alcock, 1898)

References

Xanthoidea